Simon "Siem" Heiden (12 March 1905 – 3 August 1993) was a Dutch speed skater who competed in the 1928 Winter Olympics.

He was born in IJsselmonde and died in  Rotterdam.

In 1928, he finished eleventh in the 5000 metres event, 18th in the 1500 metres competition, and 27th in the 500 metres event.

When he broke the 5000 meters world record in 1933, he was a member of athletic and football club Feyenoord. The chairman of the club, Leen van Zandvliet, congratulated him for his performance.

World record

Tournament summary

Source: SpeedSkatingStats.com

References

1905 births
1993 deaths
Dutch male speed skaters
Olympic speed skaters of the Netherlands
Speed skaters at the 1928 Winter Olympics
World record setters in speed skating
Sportspeople from Rotterdam